Ángel Ocaña (born 7 June 1960) is a Spanish former professional racing cyclist. He rode in one edition of the Tour de France and five editions of the Vuelta a España.

References

External links
 

1960 births
Living people
Spanish male cyclists
Sportspeople from Granada
Cyclists from Andalusia